The 24th Miss Chinese International Pageant, Miss Chinese International Pageant 2013 was held on February 24, 2013. Miss Chinese International 2012 Kelly Cheung of Chicago, USA crowned her successor, Gloria Tang of Vancouver, British Columbia, Canada at the end of the pageant.

Pageant information
The slogan to this year's pageant is "A Beautiful Revolution" 「美麗革命」.  For the first time since 2007, when the pageant allowed Mainland Chinese delegates to enter, there was no Regional Competition for Mainland China, with only Foshan sending a delegate.  With 16 delegates, this was the lowest turnout in pageant history until the 2016 iteration, with 14 contestant entries.

Results

Special awards

Judges
Dr. Wong Chi Ho, Jimmy SBS, MH
Mr.Kenneth Ma 
Ms.Fala Chen 
Ms. TSUI Mei-wan, Josephine MH
Mr.Lawrence Cheng

Contestant list

Crossovers
Contestants who previously competed or will be competing at other international beauty pageants:

Miss International
 2011: : Stella KAE

References

External links
 Miss Chinese International Pageant 2013 Official Site

TVB
2013 beauty pageants
Beauty pageants in Hong Kong
Miss Chinese International Pageants
2013 in Hong Kong